The VI South American Games (Spanish: Juegos Sudamericanos; Portuguese: Jogos Sul-Americanos) were a multi-sport event held in 1998 in Cuenca, Azuay, Ecuador, with some events in Azogues (futsal), Gualaceo (boxing), Guayaquil (bowling, canoeing, sailing, triathlon), Paute (wrestling), and Quito (fencing). The Games were organized by the South American Sports Organization (ODESUR). An appraisal of the games and detailed medal lists were published
elsewhere,
emphasizing the results of the Argentinian teams.

The games were officially opened by Ecuadorian vice-president Gustavo Noboa. Torch lighter at the Estadio Alejandro Serrano Aguilar was Olympic gold medalist, racewalker Jefferson Pérez. In honour of the peace treaty between Ecuador and Peru soon to be signed on October 26, 1998, officially ending the recent Cenepa War, the athlete's oath was sworn jointly by Ecuadorian cyclist Francisco Encalada and Peruvian table tennis player Eliana González.

The games were initially scheduled for May 1998, but were postponed mainly because of severe flooding caused by the El Niño climate phenomenon which resulted in more than 300 deaths.  For the first time, Guyana participated at the games.  However, the Netherlands Antilles were not present, reducing the number of participating countries to 14, as in the year 1994.

Medal count
The medal count for these Games is tabulated below. This table is sorted by the number of gold medals earned by each country.  The number of silver medals is taken into consideration next, and then the number of bronze medals.

Sports

Aquatic sports
 Swimming
 Athletics
 Bodybuilding
 Bowling
 Boxing
 Canoeing
Cycling
 Mountain Biking
 Road Cycling
 Track Cycling
 Fencing
 Futsal
Gymnastics
 Artistic Gymnastics
 Rhythmic Gymnastics
 Judo
 Karate
 Racquetball
Roller sports
 Artistic roller skating
 Roller speed skating
 Rowing
 Sailing
 Shooting
 Table Tennis
 Taekwondo
 Tennis
 Triathlon
 Weightlifting
 Wrestling

References

External links
Cuenca 98 ODESUR page

 
South American Games
S
South American Games
South American Games
S
Multi-sport events in Ecuador
Cuenca, Ecuador
October 1998 sports events in South America